The Jane Grigson Award is an award issued by the International Association of Culinary Professionals (IACP).  It honours distinguished scholarship and depth of research in cookbooks and is named in honour of the British cookery writer Jane Grigson.

The winners of the award are:
 1992: Margaret Visser, The Rituals of Dinner
 1993: Betty Fussell, The Story of Corn: The Myths and History, the Culture and Agriculture, the Art and Science of America's Quintessential Crop
 1994: William Woys Weaver and Jerry Orabona, Pennsylvania Dutch Country Cooking
 1995: Elizabeth David and Jill Norman, Harvest of the Cold Months: The Social History of Ice and Ices
 1996: Sandra L. Oliver, Saltwater Foodways: New Englanders and Their Food, at Sea and Ashore, in the Nineteenth Century 
 1997: Rachel Laudan, The Food of Paradise: Exploring Hawaii's Culinary Heritage
 1998: William Woys Weaver, Heirloom Vegetable Gardening: A Master Gardener's Guide to Planting, Seed Saving, and Cultural History
 2001: Jean Andrews, The Pepper Trail: History and Recipes from Around the World
 2002: Diane Kochilas, The Glorious Foods of Greece: Traditional Recipes from the Islands, Cities, and Villages
 2002: Stephen Brook and Gary Latham, Bordeaux: People, Power and Politics
 2004: Paul Bertolli, Cooking by Hand
 2005: Grace Young and Alan Richardson, The Breath of a Wok: Unlocking the Spirit of Chinese Wok Cooking through Recipes and Lore
 2006: Marcie Cohen Ferris, Matzoh Ball Gumbo: Culinary Tales of the Jewish South
 2006: Elizabeth Andoh, Washoku: Recipes from the Japanese Home Kitchen
 2007: Amy Besa and Romy Dorotan, Memories of Philippine Kitchens: Stories and Recipes from Far and Near
 2008: Ken Albala, Beans: A History
 2008: George M. Taber, To Cork or Not to Cork: Tradition, Romance, Science, and the Battle for the Wine Bottle
 2009: Fuchsia Dunlop, Shark's Fin and Sichuan Pepper: A Sweet-Sour Memoir of Eating in China
 2011: Greg Marley, Chanterelle Dreams, Amanita Nightmares: The Love, Lore, and Mystique of Mushrooms
 2011: Peter Menzel and Faith D'Aluisio, What I Eat: Around the World in 80 Diets
 2012: Barry Estabrook, Tomatoland
 2012: Stanley Ginsberg and Norman Berg, Inside the Jewish Bakery
 2013: Anne Willan, Mark Cherniavsky, Kyri Claflin, The Cookbook Library: Four Centuries of the Cooks, Writers, and Recipes That Made the Modern Cookbook
 2014: Jancis Robinson, Julia Harding & Jose Vouillamoz, Wine Grapes
 2015: Dave Arnold, Liquid Intelligence: The Art & Science of the Perfect Cocktail
 2016: Marion Nestle, Soda Politics: Taking On Big Soda (And Winning)
 2017: Joy Santlofer, Food City: Four Centuries of Food-Making in New York
 2018: Nathan Myhrvold and Francisco Migoya, Modernist Bread

References-

American non-fiction literary awards
Food and drink literary awards